Chris Gardner (born 1954) is an American businessman and author.

Chris Gardner may also refer to:
 Chris Gardner (baseball) (born 1969), American baseball pitcher
 Chris Gardner (curler) (born 1985), Canadian curler
 Chris Gardner (rugby league) (born 1955), nicknamed "Stan", Australian rugby league footballer

See also
 Christopher Gardner (Royal Navy officer) (born 1962), British vice admiral
 Chris Gardiner (born 1986), Scottish footballer
 Chris Garner (disambiguation)